The National Pest Management Association (NPMA), is a non-profit trade association founded in 1933 that represents the interests of the professional pest management and pest control industries in the United States.

The NPMA is headquartered in Fairfax, Virginia, and maintains a staff of technical, public policy, and member services professionals.

Organization
The policy-making body of NPMA is governed by the board of directors. As of 2013, it has a current membership of more than 7,000 pest management companies.

Activities
Members have access to accredited continuing education, technical resources, pest management research and reporting, and business service discounts. There are three staff entomologists who respond to member inquiries. Its technical department provides pest identification and treatment recommendations. The NPMA government affairs staff provides consultation on legislative and regulatory issues that impact pest management companies.

Community relations
As the NPMA’s consumer education arm, the Professional Pest Management Alliance (PPMA) educates home and business owners about health and property risks associated with pests. It has developed educational resources such as PestWorld, an information repository on pest identification and management, and PestWorld for Kids as a scholastic resource.

NPMA also funds scientific research in entomology within the area of community pest control through its affiliated Pest Management Foundation. It also provides research on pest populations and treatment options, most notably tracking the uptick in bed bug infestations and efficacy of management initiatives.

Public policy
NPMA represents the industry in Congress and before federal agencies, and also in state legislatures and agencies. Its policy work is focused on pesticide regulation, environmental protection, workforce safety, and integrated pest management.

NPMA developed GreenPro, green pest management certification program, available to pest control companies, in 2009. As of June 2013, more than 140 companies nationwide have been designated as GreenPro. This program has been nationally recognized by organizations that promote integrated approaches to reducing and eliminating pest populations, including: Natural Resources Defense Council (NDRC), EPA Pesticide Environmental Stewardship Program (PESP) and the Green Restaurant Association (GRA).

NPMA also maintains Pest PAC, a political action committee to advocate for the pest management industry at the forefront of congressional thinking.

References

External links
National Pest Management Association (Official Member Website)
PestWorld (Official Consumer Website)
PestWorld for Kids (Official Early Childhood Education Website)
What Is IPM? (Official IPM Consumer Education Website)
Quality Pro (Official Certification Website)

Professional associations based in the United States
Trade associations based in the United States
Non-profit organizations based in Fairfax, Virginia
Organizations established in 1933
Pest control organizations
501(c)(6) nonprofit organizations